, is a rāgam in Carnatic music (musical scale of South Indian classical music). It is an audava rāgam (or owdava, meaning pentatonic scale). It is a janya rāgam (derived scale), as it does not have all the seven swaras (musical notes).

Structure and Lakshana 

 is a symmetric rāgam that does not contain rishabham or nishādam. It is a pentatonic scale (audava-audava ragam in Carnatic music classification - audava meaning 'of 5'). Its  structure (ascending and descending scale) is as follows (see swaras in Carnatic music for details on below notation and terms):

 : 
 : 
(the notes used in this musical scale are shadjam, antara gandharam, shuddha madhyamam, panchamam, chathusruti dhaivatam)

 is considered a janya rāgam of Harikambhoji, the 28th Melakarta rāgam, though it can be derived from other melakarta rāgams, Chakravakam, Sooryakantam, Shankarabharanam, Vagadheeswari or Shoolini, by dropping both rishabham and nishādam.

Popular compositions 
 rāgam has a few compositions in classical music.

śrīpatē nīpada by Thyagaraja
Garuda Gamana by Patnam Subramania IyerSri Sankara Guruvaram by Maha Vaidyanatha Sivangaṃ gaṇapatē sadā  by Jayachamaraja Wodeyarbhutapataye namo namaste , bandhamu seyaradu by Muthiah BhagavatarSivachidambarame by Muthu Thandavar

 Film Songs 
 Language:Tamil 

 Related rāgams 
This section covers the theoretical and scientific aspect of this rāgam.

 Graha bhedam 's notes when shifted using Graha bhedam, yields another popular pentatonic rāgam, Hamsadhwani. Graha bhedam is the step taken in keeping the relative note frequencies same, while shifting the shadjam to the next note in the rāgam. For more details and illustration of this concept refer Graha bhedam on Hamsadhwani.

 Scale similarities Mohanam is a rāgam which has chathusruthi rishabham in place of the shuddha madhyamam. Its  structure is S R2 G3 P D2 S : S D2 P G3 R2 SShuddha Saveri is a rāgam which has chathusruthi rishabham in place of the antara gandharam. Its '' structure is S R2 M1 P D2 S : S D2 P M1 R2 S

Notes

References

Janya ragas